(Benzene)ruthenium dichloride dimer is the organoruthenium compound with the formula [(CH)RuCl]. This red-coloured, diamagnetic solid is a reagent in organometallic chemistry and homogeneous catalysis.

Preparation, structure, and reactions
The dimer is prepared by the reaction of cyclohexadienes with hydrated ruthenium trichloride. As verified by X-ray crystallography, each Ru center is coordinated to three chloride ligands and a η-benzene.  The complex can be viewed as an edge-shared bioctahedral structure.

(Benzene)ruthenium dichloride dimer reacts with Lewis bases to give monometallic adducts:
[(CH)RuCl] + 2 PPh → 2 (CH)RuCl(PPh)

Related compounds
 (cymene)ruthenium dichloride dimer, a more soluble analogue of (benzene)ruthenium dichloride dimer.
 (mesitylene)ruthenium dichloride dimer, another more soluble derivative.

References

Organoruthenium compounds
Chloro complexes
Dimers (chemistry)
Half sandwich compounds
Ruthenium(II) compounds